Lake Travis can refer to the lake located west of Austin or the communities that border its lake.

Places named after Lake Travis 
 Lake Travis-Lake located west of Austin
 Lake Travis High School-Central Texas high school
 Lake Travis Independent School District-Texas school district